Adelpherupa aethiopicalis is a moth in the family Crambidae. It was described by Koen V. N. Maes in 2002. It is found in Ethiopia.

References

Moths described in 2002
Schoenobiinae
Moths of Africa